Guillermo Carter Garibaldi (born 4 July 1977) is a Mexican former professional tennis player.

Carter, who comes from Guadalajara, played collegiate tennis for the University of Oregon and earned All-American honors in 2000. He represented the Mexico Davis Cup team in a 2003 rubber against the Netherlands Antilles, winning both his singles and doubles rubber. His career included an ATP Tour doubles main draw appearance at the 2003 Mexican Open in Acapulco. He had best rankings of 737 in singles and 467 in doubles.

ITF Futures titles

Doubles: (2)

See also
List of Mexico Davis Cup team representatives

References

External links
 
 
 

1977 births
Living people
Mexican male tennis players
Oregon Ducks athletes
College men's tennis players in the United States
Sportspeople from Guadalajara, Jalisco
21st-century Mexican people